The dorsal nerve of the penis  is the deepest division of the pudendal nerve; it accompanies the internal pudendal artery along the ramus of the ischium; it then runs forward along the margin of the inferior ramus of the pubis, between the superior and inferior layers of the fascia of the urogenital diaphragm.

Piercing the inferior layer it gives a branch to the corpus cavernosum penis, and passes forward, in company with the dorsal artery of the penis, between the layers of the suspensory ligament, on to the dorsum of the penis, and ends on the glans penis.

It innervates the skin of the penis.

Gallery

See also
 Cavernous nerves of penis

References

External links
  - "Cross-section of the penis."
 
 
 
 
 

Nerves of the lower limb and lower torso
Human penis anatomy